Absu was an American extreme metal band from Dallas, Texas. Their demos and first album leaned towards death metal, but evolved more towards a black metal and thrash metal style which includes elements of Celtic and folk music (and later, elements of jazz fusion, progressive rock and psychedelic music) which the band calls "Mythological Occult Metal". Their lyrical themes are esoteric, including themes of Celtic, Sumerian and Mesopotamian myths and legends, alchemy, numerology, magick, and sorcery.

History
The band originally formed as Dolmen in 1989, and after briefly taking the name Azathoth, they became Absu in 1991. The original members were Equitant Ifernain (guitars, bass, lyrics) and Shaftiel (guitars, vocals). After recording two demos and releasing an EP, they were joined by Proscriptor McGovern (Russ R. Givens – drums, vocals, lyrics), David Athron Mystica (guitars), and Black Massith (keyboards, synth, sequencing). After releasing their first album, Barathrum: V.I.T.R.I.O.L., in 1993, Absu narrowed their line-up to a three piece when David Athron Mystica and Black Massith left. For live performances, they recruited the help of Mezzadurus (from the Philadelphia black/thrash band Bloodstorm) and recorded as a three piece with Shaftiel and Proscriptor sharing vocal duties and Proscriptor taking over keyboard and synth duties as well. The band stayed with this line-up for some time. With their second album, The Sun of Tiphareth (1995), the band explored Sumerian, Mesopotamian, and Celtic mythology. The band's third album, The Third Storm of Cythraul (1997), drew inspiration mainly from Celtic mythology, and continued their intellectual approach. Over the next four years, Equitant and Proscriptor worked with the ambient group Equimanthorn and Absu's sole release was the EP In the Eyes of Ioldánach (1998).

In 2001, Absu recruited a new second guitarist, Kashshapxu. The band released their fifth album that year, Tara, which continued the Celtic theme of Cythraul and Ioldánach, and featured bagpipes on the title track. The album is considered the band's masterpiece, and is described by McGovern as a concept album:

"The album is presented in a chronicled assembly dividing it into two phases: 'Ioldánach's Pedagogy' and 'The Cythrául Klan's Scrutiny'. Certain goals and objectives were finally accomplished with 'Tara', through exploration of our ancestral attributes and channeling divisions of pure magic within our minds and souls".

This line-up was short-lived as soon after recording Tara, Equitant left due to musical differences (however, he and Proscriptor still collaborate on other projects to this day). Shortly after that, Proscriptor severely injured his hand in an accident, which required surgery to repair his hand. After almost a year of healing and therapy, he was ready to play again, but Shaftiel no longer had any interest in Absu and Kashshapxu had also left the band due to musical differences. Proscriptor then put Absu on hold and decided to work on other projects. During this period he auditioned for Slayer, but Slayer eventually went with their original drummer, Dave Lombardo. In 2005, Proscriptor and Equitant put together a collection of rare, live and unreleased Absu recordings and released it under the title Mythological Occult Metal: 1991–2001 based on the suggestion of a fan.

With Absu still on hold, Proscriptor continued to work on other projects including Equimanthorn (with Equitant and members of The Soil Bleeds Black; dark ambient music), Proscriptor (his own project of neo-folk/classic rock fused music), and Starchaser Network (with Equitant and Victorious; electronic art/rock band). Additionally, he was the drummer/vocalist for Melechesh for six years (1999–2005, although he still contributes lyrics and vocals) and has done session work with Judas Iscariot, Thornspawn, and Magnus Thorsen. Proscriptor also has his own record label, Tarot Productions.

In May 2007, Prosciptor finally announced the addition of Vastator Terrarum and Aethyris MacKay to the band. In early 2008, Absu announced they had signed with Candlelight Records for future recordings, but that they would release a 7-inch EP through Relapse Records. That EP was Speed N' Spikes, a limited series featuring their first new material in seven years. In March 2008, Vastator Terrarum left and was replaced by Zawicizuz (formerly of the bands Infernal Oak, Rape Pillage Burn, and Bleed the Son). In October 2008, the band added ex-Panzram member Ezezu on bass and vocals, after completing the recording of their self-titled album, released on February 16 (Europe) and February 24 (USA), 2009, on Candlelight Records.

In September 2009, Zawicizuz left Absu and was replaced by Vis Crom and immediately embarked on a European tour with Pantheon I, Razor of Occam and Zoroaster.

In November 2010, Absu announced that they would be doing a six-date U.S. tour with Immortal in February 2011 as a three piece as Aethyris MacKay has left to join Pantheon I. After this tour, Absu entered the studio to record their next album, titled Abzu (released in October 2011), followed up with a tour.

In 2012, they released a single through Adult Swim (Williams Street Records) titled "Hall of the Masters" and later a video was produced for the song, their first official promotional video in 14 years (the previous being "Mannannan" in 1998).  This song was later released on a 7-inch EP, titled Telepaths Within Nin-Edin.  The band was working on the recording/post production for their next album, titled "Apsu" and it is unclear if the album will ever be released.

In 2017, Melissa Moore was fired from the band after coming out as transgender. 

On January 27, 2020, Absu announced on their Facebook page that they will dissolve Absu after three decades of existence. The decision is, as mentioned in the farewell message.

"After meager deliberation and zero remorse, I have decided to dissolve Absu after three decades of existence. Collectively and universally speaking, this decision is finite due to insoluble circumstances, which has led to this ultimate result. No amount of time, exertion, formula or fashion can alter my verdict."

In July 2020, it was announced Proscriptor McGovern had disbanded Absu to form a new version of the band called Proscriptor McGovern's Apsû.

Discography

Albums
Barathrum: V.I.T.R.I.O.L. (1993)
The Sun of Tiphareth (1995)
The Third Storm of Cythraul (1997)
Tara (2001)
Absu (2009)
Abzu (2011)

EPs
The Temples of Offal (7-inch EP, 1992)
...And Shineth Unto the Cold Cometh... (7-inch EP, 1995)
In the Eyes of Ioldánach (EP, 1998)
L'Attaque du Tyran: Toulouse, Le 28 Avril 1997 (7-inch EP, 2007)
Split with Demonical (7-inch EP, 2007)
Speed n' Spikes No. 2 (split 7-inch EP with Rumpelstiltskin Grinder, 2008)
Split with Infernal Stronghold (split 7-inch Flexi EP, 2011)
Telepaths Within Nin-Edin (7-inch EP, 2015)

Demos
Return of the Ancients (1991)
Immortal Sorcery (1991)
Infinite and Profane Thrones (1992)
Promo Tape 1993 (1993)

Additional releases
In the Visions of Ioldánach (video, 2000)
Mythological Occult Metal: 1991–2001 (compilation album, 2005)
"Hall of the Masters" (Internet single/video released through Adult Swim's 2012 Single Series)
Origin: War and Magick (Compilation of pre-Absu recordings, 2014)

Members
Final lineup
Proscriptor McGovern (Russley Randell Givens) – lead vocals, drums, percussion, mellotron, lyrics, arrangements (1992–2020)
Ezezu (Paul Williamson) – bass, backing vocals (2008–2020)

Former
Shaftiel (Mike Kelly) – guitars, vocals (1990–2003)
Equitant Ifernain (Ray Heflin) – guitars, bass (1990–2002)
Gary Lindholm – guitars (1990–1992)
Daniel Benbow – drums (1990–1992)
Daviel Athron Mystica (Dave Ward) – guitars (1992–1993)
Black Massith (Brian Artwick) – keyboards, synth, sequencing (1992–1993)
Aethyris McKay (Shandy Mckay) – guitars, synthesizers (2007–2010)
Zawicizuz (Geoffrey Sawicky) – guitars, keyboards and backing vocals (2007–2009)
Vastator Terrarum – guitars, backing vocals (2007)
Vis Crom (Melissa Moore) – guitars (2009–2018)

Session/live
Mezzadurus (Chris Gamble) – vocals, bass (1995–2002)
Kashshapxu (Rad Davis) – guitars (2001–2003)

Timeline

References

External links
Official Website

American black metal musical groups
American thrash metal musical groups
Heavy metal musical groups from Texas
Musical groups from Dallas
Musical groups established in 1989
1989 establishments in Texas
American musical trios